The Stabat Mater is a 13th-century Christian hymn to Mary, which portrays her suffering as Jesus Christ's mother during his crucifixion. Its author may be either the Franciscan friar Jacopone da Todi or Pope Innocent III. The title comes from its first line, "Stabat Mater dolorosa", which means "the sorrowful mother was standing".

The hymn is sung at the liturgy on the memorial of Our Lady of Sorrows. The Stabat Mater has been set to music by many Western composers.

Date
The Stabat Mater has often been ascribed to Jacopone da Todi, OFM (ca. 1230–1306), but this has been strongly challenged by the discovery of the earliest notated copy of the Stabat Mater in a 13th-century gradual belonging to the Dominican nuns in Bologna (Museo Civico Medievale MS 518, fo. 200v-04r).

The Stabat Mater was well known by the end of the 14th century and Georgius Stella wrote of its use in 1388, while other historians note its use later in the same century. In Provence, about 1399, it was used during the nine days' processions.

As a liturgical sequence, the Stabat Mater was suppressed, along with hundreds of other sequences, by the Council of Trent, but restored to the missal by Pope Benedict XIII in 1727 for the Feast of the Seven Dolours of the Blessed Virgin Mary.

Text and translation
The Latin text below is from an 1853 Roman Breviary and is one of multiple extant versions of the poem. The first English translation by Edward Caswall is not literal but preserves the trochaic tetrameter rhyme scheme and sense of the original text. The second English version is a more formal equivalence translation.

{| style="border:0px"
|-valign="top"
|
<poem lang="la">1. Stabat mater dolorósajuxta Crucem lacrimósa,
dum pendébat Fílius.

2. Cuius ánimam geméntem,
contristátam et doléntempertransívit gládius.

3. O quam tristis et afflíctafuit illa benedícta,
mater Unigéniti!

4. Quae mœrébat et dolébat,
pia Mater, dum vidébatnati pœnas ínclyti.

5. Quis est homo qui non fleret,matrem Christi si vidéret
in tanto supplício?

6. Quis non posset contristári
Christi Matrem contempláridoléntem cum Fílio?

7. Pro peccátis suæ gentisvidit Jésum in torméntis,
et flagéllis súbditum.

8. Vidit suum dulcem Natum
moriéndo desolátum,dum emísit spíritum.

9. Eja, Mater, fons amórisme sentíre vim dolóris
fac, ut tecum lúgeam.

10. Fac, ut árdeat cor meum
in amándo Christum Deumut sibi compláceam.

11. Sancta Mater, istud agas,crucifíxi fige plagas
cordi meo válide.

12. Tui Nati vulneráti,
tam dignáti pro me pati,pœnas mecum dívide.

13. Fac me tecum pie flere,crucifíxo condolére,
donec ego víxero.

14. Juxta Crucem tecum stare,
et me tibi sociárein planctu desídero.

15. Virgo vírginum præclára,mihi iam non sis amára,
fac me tecum plángere.

16. Fac ut portem Christi mortem,
passiónis fac consórtem,et plagas recólere.

17. Fac me plagis vulnerári,fac me Cruce inebriári,
et cruóre Fílii.

18. Flammis ne urar succénsus,
per te, Virgo, sim defénsusin die iudícii.

19. Christe, cum sit hinc exire,da per Matrem me veníre
ad palmam victóriæ.

20. Quando corpus moriétur,
fac, ut ánimæ donéturparadísi glória.

Amen.
</poem>
||
At the Cross her station keeping,
Stood the mournful Mother weeping,
Close to Jesus to the last:

Through her heart, his sorrow sharing,
All his bitter anguish bearing,
now at length the sword has pass'd.

Oh, how sad and sore distress'd
Was that Mother highly blest
Of the sole-begotten One!

Christ above in torment hangs;
She beneath beholds the pangs
Of her dying glorious Son.

Is there one who would not weep,
Whelm'd in miseries so deep,
Christ's dear Mother to behold?

Can the human heart refrain
From partaking in her pain,
In that Mother's pain untold?

Bruis'd, derided, curs'd, defil'd,
She beheld her tender Child
All with bloody scourges rent;

For the sins of his own nation,
Saw Him hang in desolation,
Till His Spirit forth He sent.

O thou Mother! fount of love!
Touch my spirit from above,
Make my heart with thine accord:

Make me feel as thou hast felt;
Make my soul to glow and melt
With the love of Christ my Lord.

Holy Mother! pierce me through;
In my heart each wound renew
Of my Saviour crucified:

Let me share with thee His pain,
Who for all my sins was slain,
Who for me in torments died.

Let me mingle tears with thee,
Mourning Him who mourn'd for me,
All the days that I may live:

By the Cross with thee to stay;
There with thee to weep and pray;
Is all I ask of thee to give.

Virgin of all virgins blest!,
Listen to my fond request:
Let me share thy grief divine;

Let me, to my latest breath,
In my body bear the death
Of that dying Son of thine.

Wounded with his every wound,
Steep my soul till it hath swoon'd,
In His very blood away;

Be to me, O Virgin, nigh,
Lest in flames I burn and die,
In his awful Judgment day.

Christ, when Thou shalt call me hence,
Be Thy Mother my defence,
Be Thy Cross my victory;

While my body here decays,
May my soul thy goodness praise,
Safe in Paradise with Thee.

– Translation by Edward Caswall
||
The sorrowful mother was standing
beside the Cross weeping,
while the Son was hanging.

Whose moaning soul,
depressed and grieving,
the sword has passed through.

O how sad and stricken
was that blessed [woman],
mother of the Only-begotten [one]!

Who was mourning and suffering,
the pious Mother, while she was watching
the punishments of the glorious son.

Who is the person who would not weep,
if he had seen the mother of Christ
in such great suffering?

Who would not be able to be saddened
to behold the Mother of Christ
grieving with the Son?

For the sins of his people
she saw Jesus in torments,
and subjected to lashes.

She saw her sweet Son
dying forsaken,
while he sent forth [his] spirit.

Come now, O Mother, fountain of love
Make me feel the power of sorrow
that I might mourn with you.

Grant that my heart may burn
in loving Christ the God
that I might please him.

O Holy Mother, may you do that,
fix the wounds of the cross
mightily in my heart.

Of your wounded son,
[who] so deigned to suffer for me,
Share [his] penalties with me.

Make me cry dutifully with you,
to suffer (with him) on the cross,
as long as I shall have lived.

To stand by the Cross with you,
to unite me to you
in weeping [this] I desire.

O noble Virgin of virgins,
Be not bitter with me now,
Make me mourn with you.

Grant that I might bear the death of Christ,
Make [me] kindred in the passion,
and contemplate the wounds.

Make me injured by the wounds,
make me drunken by the Cross,
and by the blood of the Son.

Lest I be consumed burned by flames,
through you, O Virgin, may I be defended
on the day of judgement.

O Christ, when it is time to depart hence,
grant me to come through the Mother,
to the palm of victory.

When the body will decay,
grant that it may be bestowed on [my] soul
the glory of paradise.

Amen.
|}

Musical settings

Composers who have written settings of the Stabat Mater include:
 Josquin des Prez
 Orlande de Lassus (1585)
 Palestrina: Stabat Mater (c.1590)
 Giovanni Felice Sances (1643)
 Marc-Antoine Charpentier H.15 & H.387 (1685–90)
 Louis-Nicolas Clérambault C. 70 (17..)
 Sébastien de Brossard SdB.8 (1702)
 Emanuele d'Astorga (1707)
 Vivaldi: Stabat Mater (1712)
 Domenico Scarlatti (1715)
 Nicola Fago (1719)
 Scarlatti: Stabat Mater (1723)
 Antonio Caldara (~1725)
 Agostino Steffani (1727)
 Pergolesi: Stabat Mater (1736)
 Nicola Logroscino (1760)
 Florian Leopold Gassmann (~1765)
 Haydn: Stabat Mater (1767)
 Giuseppe Tartini (1769)
 Tommaso Traetta (1770)
 Antonio Soler (1775)
 Boccherini: Stabat Mater (1781, 1801)
 Franz Ignaz Beck (1782)
 Pasquale Cafaro (1784)
 Schubert: Stabat Mater in G minor (1815) and Stabat Mater in F minor (1816)
 Rossini: Stabat Mater (1831–1841)
 Peter Cornelius (1849)
 Liszt: part of the oratorio Christus (1862–1866)
 Dvořák: Stabat Mater (1876–1877)
 Laura Netzel (1890)
 Josef Bohuslav Foerster: Op. 56 (1891–1892)
 : Op. 50 (1893)
 Giuseppe Verdi (1897)
 Charles Villiers Stanford (1906)
 Toivo Kuula (1919)
 George Oldroyd (1922)
 Szymanowski: Stabat Mater (1925–1926)
 Johann Nepomuk David (1927)
 Lennox Berkeley (1947)
 Julia Perry (1947)
 Poulenc: Stabat Mater (1950)
 Penderecki: in St Luke Passion'' (1963–1966)
 Pärt: Stabat Mater (1985)
 Knut Nystedt (1986)
 Amaral Vieira (1988)
 Trond Kverno (1991)
 Pawel Lukaszewski (1994)
 Vladimir Martynov (1994)
 Salvador Brotons (1997)
 Frank Ferko (1999)
 Vladimír Godár (2001)
 Bruno Coulais (2005)
 Jenkins: Stabat Mater (2008)
 Paul Mealor (2009, revised 2010)
 metr. Hilarion (Alfeyev) (2011)
 Jean-Charles Gandrille (2014) Last choral work performed at Notre-Dame de Paris (2019)
 Franco Simone (2014)
 James MacMillan (2015)
 Vache Sharafyan

Most of the settings are in Latin, but Karol Szymanowski's and Paul Bebenek's are in Polish, although Szymanowski's may also be sung in Latin. George Oldroyd's setting is in Latin but includes an English translation for Anglican/Episcopalian use.

See also
 Catholic Mariology

References

External links

 Website about (now) 250 different Stabat Mater compositions: information about the composers, the music and the text. The site also includes translations of the text in 20 languages.
 Several English translations
 Chant performed by "Exsurge Domine" vocal ensemble.
 Karol Szymanowski's "Stabat Mater". Spanish Radio and Television Symphony Orchestra. Thomas Dausgaard, conductor. Live concert.

Marian hymns
 
13th-century hymns